Ali Asaad Attar (born 15 May 1980) is a Lebanese former footballer who played as a midfielder or full-back.

Club career 
Attar played in the Lebanese Premier League for Ahed and Mabarra. He was included in the Team of the Season in the 2002–03 and 2003–04 seasons.

Honours
Individual
 Lebanese Premier League Team of the Season: 2002–03, 2003–04

References

External links
 
 
 

1980 births
Living people
People from Baalbek District
Lebanese footballers
Association football midfielders
Association football fullbacks
Al Ahed FC players
Al Mabarra Club players
Lebanese Premier League players
Lebanon international footballers